Euthriostoma saharicum is a species of sea snail, a marine gastropod mollusk in the family Buccinidae, the true whelks.

Description
The length of the shell attains 43.5 mm.

Distribution
This marine species occurs off Mauritania.

References

 Marche-Marchad I. & Brebion P. 1977. Sur un Buccinidé nouveau d'affinité miocène vivant au large du Sénégal. Comptes Rendus Hebdomadaires des Séances de l'Académie des Sciences (série D), 285(4): 339-342
 Gofas, S.; Le Renard, J.; Bouchet, P. (2001). Mollusca. in: Costello, M.J. et al. (eds), European Register of Marine Species: a check-list of the marine species in Europe and a bibliography of guides to their identification. Patrimoines Naturels. 50: 180-213
 Bouchet P. & Warén A. (1986 ["1985"]). Mollusca Gastropoda: Taxonomical notes on tropical deep water Buccinidae with descriptions of new taxa. in: Forest, J. (Ed.) Résultats des Campagnes MUSORSTOM I et II Philippines (1976, 1980). Tome 2. Mémoires du Muséum national d'Histoire naturelle. Série A, Zoologie. 133: 457-499

External links
 Locard A. (1897-1898). Expéditions scientifiques du Travailleur et du Talisman pendant les années 1880, 1881, 1882 et 1883. Mollusques testacés. Paris, Masson. vol. 1 [1897, p. 1-516 pl. 1-22; vol. 2 [1898], p. 1-515, pl. 1-18]

Buccinidae
Gastropods described in 1897